Couder may refer to:
 André Couder (1897–1979), French astronomer and optician
 Auguste Couder (1789-1873), French painter
 Juan Manuel Couder (born 1934), Spanish tennis player
 Couder (crater), a lunar crater